The 1931 Auburn Tigers baseball team represented the Auburn Tigers of the Auburn University in the 1931 NCAA baseball season.

References

Auburn Tigers baseball seasons
Auburn
Auburn Tigers
Southern Conference baseball champion seasons